Ken Marlon Charles a.k.a. KMC (born 5 January 1971) is a soca artist from Trinidad. Famous for hits like "Soul on Fire", "Soca Bashment" and "Bashment to Carnival" KMC is signed to the US-based record label Sequence Records. Considered to be one of Trinidad's top soca artists, KMC has over sixteen years experience in the music industry. He has made a name for himself as a solo artist, songwriter, producer and frontman of the band Red, White & Black.

Early years
KMC is one of nine children. He was born and raised in the village of Rio Claro and then moved to Chaguanas.

Career 
KMC always had a passion for music. As a young child he used to sneak about and listen to the bands in his village. "At the age of seven, I used to go under the house by the band and when they weren't around I would play the drum set." As time marched on, the same energy and precociousness that brought the young KMC to the drum set also brought him to teach himself how to play music. "Music is something I was never taught. I was never taught to play the keyboard. I learned to do everything on my own. Love is what made me master it. Everything I do is by ear and not by reading," he proclaims.

KMC started his musical career as a dance-hall artist, recording and releasing a total if sixteen records. In 1998, he decided to test his skills in the Soca genre, bursting onto the scene with songs like "Kaya", "Bashment to Carnival" and "Soca Bashment". These were well received by his fans and helped to establish KMC as a leading Soca artist.

With over ten independently released Soca albums and compilations to his name, KMC is responsible for the Voodoo, Drunk Man, Concubine, Party Alliance, Thunderbirds, X-Out, Stinging Nettle, and Tear Drop Riddims, amongst others. He has also produced songs for some of the leading Soca artists, including Machel Montano, Bunji Garlin, Maximus Dan, Destra Garcia, Denise Belfon, and Jungle. KMC is known for songs like "Doh Want to Know", "Carnival Rags", "Rough Wine", "First Experience", "Flopping Up", "Cyah X Me Out" and "Animal".

In April 2005, KMC was signed to the American music label Sequence Records. His debut album on the label was entitled Soul on Fire after the album's first single. The album entered the Billboard 200 at number 84 and has sold approximately 285,000 copies worldwide.

"Soul on Fire", the single, was the first track released from the album in June 2005. The song's remix, featured Jamaican dancehall star Beenie Man and American disc jockey Fat Man Scoop. The video for the Soul on Fire single was filmed in Tobago and featured the Tobagonian born, Trinidadian model Teri Bovell.

In October 2005, KMC joined Beenie Man on his US "King of the Dancehall" tour.

Discography

Albums
2005: Soul on Fire

References

External links
 The Trinidad Guardian -Online Edition Ver 2.0
 

1971 births
Living people
Soca musicians
20th-century Trinidad and Tobago male singers
20th-century Trinidad and Tobago singers
21st-century Trinidad and Tobago male singers
21st-century Trinidad and Tobago singers